The Zimbabwean cricket team toured South Africa from 8–22 October 2010. The tour consisted of two Twenty20s (T20) and three One Day Internationals (ODIs).

Twenty20 Series

1st T20I

2nd T20I

ODI series

1st ODI

2nd ODI

3rd ODI

2010–11 South African cricket season
2010-11
International cricket competitions in 2010–11
South Africa